Juri Judt (born 24 July 1986) is a German former professional footballer who played as a defensive midfielder or right-back.

Club career
Judt was born in Karaganda in the former Soviet Union.

In April 2016, with his Rot-Weiß Erfurt contract running out, he announced he would retire from professional football at the end of the season. At the beginning of the 2016–17 season, he played a few matches for lower league side SV Seligenporten but stopped playing in August.

International career
Judt represented the Germany national under-21 football team on four occasions.

Amateur play
Judt plays amateur football for local side FC Bayern Kickers Nürnberg.

References

External links
 Juri Judt at official FCN website
 
 

1986 births
Living people
Association football midfielders
German footballers
SpVgg Greuther Fürth players
1. FC Nürnberg players
1. FC Nürnberg II players
RB Leipzig players
1. FC Saarbrücken players
FC Rot-Weiß Erfurt players
SV Seligenporten players
Bundesliga players
2. Bundesliga players
3. Liga players
Germany under-21 international footballers
Kazakhstani people of German descent
Citizens of Germany through descent
Kazakhstani emigrants to Germany
Russian and Soviet-German people